Guillem Anglada-Escudé (born in Ullastrell, Barcelona in 1979), is a Catalan astronomer. In 2016, he led a team of astronomers under the Pale Red Dot campaign, which resulted in the confirmation of the existence of Proxima Centauri b, the closest potentially habitable extrasolar planet to Earth, followed by the publication of a peer-reviewed article in Nature.
In 2017, Anglada-Escudé was named amongst the 100 most influential people according to Time, and one of Natures top 10 scientists of the year 2016.
He is currently a research fellow at Institut de Ciències de l'Espai.

Publications

References

External links
https://nai.nasa.gov/directory/anglada-escude-guillem/
https://www.researchgate.net/profile/Guillem_Anglada-Escude

Academics from Catalonia
21st-century Spanish astronomers
Spanish astrophysicists
Astronomers from Catalonia
Planetary scientists
Scientists from Barcelona
University of Barcelona alumni
Academics of Queen Mary University of London
Academics of the University of Hertfordshire
Academic staff of the University of Göttingen
1979 births
Living people